Coincourt is a commune in the Meurthe-et-Moselle département in north-eastern France.

History
Before 1870, Coincourt was part of the canton of Vic-sur-Seille. After the Treaty of Frankfurt (1871), it was integrated into the new canton of Arracourt along with eight other communes that remained French. Coincourt was part of Parroy between 1 January 1973 and 1 January 1987.

See also
Communes of the Meurthe-et-Moselle department

References

Communes of Meurthe-et-Moselle